Lloyd Rutherford Craighill (葛兴仁, September 3, 1886 – March 13, 1971) (Honorary D.D., Virginia Theological Seminary) was an American missionary to China, born in Lynchburg, Virginia. Craighill was consecrated on November 29, 1940, as the second Bishop of Anking. He succeeded Daniel Trumbull Huntington, who had served as first missionary Bishop of Anking. Craighill left China in 1949. His resignation was accepted by the 1949 General Convention of the Episcopal Church, on September 28, and was effective immediately.

References

 Marian G. Craighill, The Craighills of China (Ambler, Pennsylvania: The Trinity Press, 1972).

External links

See also

Christianity in China

1886 births
1971 deaths
20th-century Anglican bishops in China
Bishops of the Episcopal Church (United States)
Christian missions in China
People from Lynchburg, Virginia
Episcopal bishops of Anking
20th-century American clergy